Ian Abercrombie (11 September 1934 – 26 January 2012) was an English actor and comedian. He was best known for playing Justin Pitt (Elaine Benes' boss) during the sixth season of Seinfeld. He also played Alfred Pennyworth on Birds of Prey, Rupert Cavanaugh (Ian Hainsworth's butler) in Desperate Housewives, Professor Crumbs in Wizards of Waverly Place, and Palpatine in Star Wars: The Clone Wars.

Early life
Abercrombie was born on 11 September 1934 in Grays, Essex, England. He began his theatrical career during the Blitz in World War II. After his footwork years during which he earned Bronze, Silver and gold medals in stage dancing, he performed in London, Scotland, Ireland, and the Netherlands. He moved to the United States at age 17.

He made his American stage debut in 1951 in a production of Stalag 17 with Jason Robards and Jules Munshin. Many plays in summer stock, regional, and off-Broadway followed in a variety of theatrical offerings, from revues to Shakespeare (in a particularly low period, he worked as a magician's assistant for $10 a performance).

In 1957, he was drafted into the United States Army and stationed in West Germany as part of Special Services, where he directed the continental premiere of Separate Tables.

In the United States, he went to California for a backers' audition, which went nowhere, but he began a long film and television career. He received awards  for his work in Sweet Prince with Keir Dullea; Teeth 'N'smiles; A Doll's House with Linda Purl; and The Arcata Promise, opposite Anthony Hopkins. He received acclaim for the one-man show Jean Cocteau—A Mirror Image.

Career
Abercrombie was known to cult film audiences as Wiseman in the comedy horror film Army of Darkness (1993). He guest-starred on many television series such as Seinfeld, The Nanny, Wizards of Waverly Place, Airwolf, Babylon 5, Barnaby Jones and NewsRadio.

On radio, he was heard in several productions of the Hollywood Theater of the Ear. Abercrombie voiced Ambrose in Oscar winner Rango (2011). He also portrayed Ganthet on Green Lantern: The Animated Series, completing his work as the character shortly before his death.

Star Wars: The Clone Wars
Abercrombie voiced Chancellor Palpatine/Darth Sidious in the 2008 film The Clone Wars, the television continuation, and two spin-off video games (Star Wars: The Clone Wars: Republic Heroes and Star Wars: The Clone Wars: Lightsaber Duels). Supervising director Dave Filoni said that Abercrombie was very excited that Darth Sidious finally was going to be seen in person and not as a hologram anymore. During Celebration VI, Filoni mentioned that before his death, Abercrombie recorded for most of season five as the character, but did not finish, so actor Tim Curry was brought in to voice Palpatine. Abercrombie also voiced the character in the Clovis story arc of the Lost Missions (season six), since it was originally a part of the season four, and later the season five, line-up. This was his final released work, shown in 2014.

Personal life
In 1956, Abercrombie was married to Elizabeth Romano and they divorced in 1978 after 22 years of marriage. In 1984, he was married to Gladys Abercrombie until his death in 2012.

Death
Abercrombie died from kidney failure in Los Angeles, California at Cedars-Sinai Medical Center on 26 January 2012, twenty days after the Wizards of Waverly Place finale. He was 77.

Star Wars Celebration VI included the panel "Vocal Stars of The Clone Wars", hosted by James Arnold Taylor and featuring cast members Matt Lanter, Ashley Eckstein, Dee Bradley Baker and Tom Kane. The cast dedicated the panel to Abercrombie. Additionally, The Clone Wars episode "The Lawless" includes a dedication to Abercrombie in the opening titles.

Filmography

Film

Television

Video games

References

External links
 
 
 

1934 births
2012 deaths
Military personnel from Essex
20th-century English male actors
21st-century English male actors
British expatriate male actors in the United States
Deaths from kidney failure
English expatriates in the United States
English male film actors
English male stage actors
English male television actors
English male voice actors
Male actors from Essex
People from Grays, Essex
United States Army soldiers